Martin Roy (born February 1, 1974) is a Canadian professional stock car racing driver. He has also run the entirety of the NASCAR Canadian Tire Series.

Racing career

K&N Pro Series East
Roy made one start in the K&N Pro Series East, the season-opening 2013 race at Bristol Motor Speedway, where he started 31st and finished 22nd, a lap down.

Canadian Tire Series
Roy debuted in 2011, running four races. Running Dodges, he crashed out of his first attempt at Circuit ICAR but did not crash again that season. He recorded a best finish of 13th at Circuit de Trois-Rivieres. Roy jumped to the full schedule in 2012, qualifying for all twelve races, getting his first top-ten, his first top-five, and finishing eighth in the point standings. He also won Rookie of the Year in that series. In 2013, Roy set new personal highs in top fives (four), top tens (nine) and finished fourth in the point standings for the twelve race season. He continued running King Autosport's Canada branch after getting out of the drivers seat.

Camping World Truck Series
Roy debuted in the Camping World Truck Series with King Autosport, owned by fellow Canadian Mario Gosselin. The race was run at Canadian Tire Motorsport Park, a road course visited in the Pinty's Series. Roy qualified 21st and finished 14th.

Xfinity Series
Roy first attempted an Xfinity race in 2013, failing to qualify at Bristol Motor Speedway for King Autosport. In 2014, Roy ran five races with King, falling out of three races with engine problems and posting a best finish of 30th in his debut race at Phoenix International Raceway. For 2015, he piloted the No. 90 in seven races, posting a best finish of 15th in the Subway Firecracker 250 at Daytona International Speedway. In 2016, Roy returned in a limited capacity, driving two of the first ten races. He continued to run a partial schedule for King Autosport with sponsorship from Gamache Truck Centers. His runs were mostly mid-20s to high-30s. In 2017, Roy made his name known at Las Vegas Motor Speedway when he missed a sliding Dakoda Armstrong by only inches at full speed.

Personal life
Roy was injured skiing before the 2015 racing season, which derailed plans for Roy and forced King Autosport to put Dexter Bean in to rides where Roy would have potentially driven.

Motorsports career results

NASCAR
(key) (Bold – Pole position awarded by qualifying time. Italics – Pole position earned by points standings or practice time. * – Most laps led.)

Xfinity Series

Camping World Truck Series

K&N Pro Series East

Canadian Tire Series

 Season still in progress
 Ineligible for series points

References

External links
 

1974 births
Living people
NASCAR drivers
Racing drivers from Quebec